British politician Alan Clark kept a regular diary from 1955 until August 1999 (during his second spell as a Member of Parliament) when he was incapacitated due to the onset of the brain tumour which was to be the cause of his death a month later. The last month of his life would be chronicled by his wife, Jane.

Volume 1 Diaries: In Power 1983–1992 (1993)
Volume 2 Diaries: Into Politics 1972–1982 (2000)
Volume 3 Diaries: The Last Diaries 1993–1999 (2002)

Alan Clark published his diaries covering the period 1983 to 1992 after he left the House of Commons, deciding not to seek re-election to his Plymouth Sutton seat.  Published in 1993 and known simply as Diaries (although later subtitled In Power), they have been recognised as a definitive account of the downfall of Prime Minister Margaret Thatcher.

Before his death in 1999, Clark had started work on the prequel to the 1983–1992 Diaries to cover his entry in politics, from seeking a Conservative Association to adopt him as their Parliamentary Candidate in 1972 until the 1983 general election. Published a year after his death, this volume was titled Diaries: Into Politics and covered 1972 to 1983.

The final volume, covering Clark's decision not to seek re-election at the 1992 general election, his regret at leaving the House of Commons and then his return to Parliament was published in 2002 and included Clark's final days dying from a brain tumour.

Throughout his diaries Clark refers admiringly to Henry "Chips" Channon and his diaries.  He also quotes Adolf Hitler, to whom he refers as "Wolf".

The diaries include much reference to Clark's love of his chalet at Zermatt, his Scottish estate at Eriboll and the architecture of and country around Saltwood Castle, his home in Kent. Clark's fascination with classic cars is also evident, as is his enthusiasm for backgammon.

The Diaries were serialised into six episodes of The Alan Clark Diaries by the BBC and shown in 2004 with John Hurt and Jenny Agutter.

Diaries: In Power 1983–1991 
The first published diaries open with Alan Clark, Conservative Member of Parliament for Plymouth Sutton since February 1974, about to seek re-election at the 1983 general election. The Conservatives were expected to win the election, following the recent Falklands War and a disunited Labour Party, and Clark expected to be promoted from the back benches.

Early on in the diaries, Clark records the death of his father, the author, broadcaster and art historian Kenneth Clark, from whom Clark inherited Saltwood Castle in Hythe, Kent.

In the very next entry in the diary, we get an insight into one of Clark's recurring lapses with the opposite sex. His opponent at the election, the Labour candidate, was 22-year-old Frances Holland, of whom Clark records;

Clark is, at this time, also carrying on an adulterous affair with Valerie Harkess, the wife of a South African judge, and her two daughters (to whom he referred collectively as "the coven"). Clark made no effort to disguise the coven's identity. The affair became public knowledge in 1992 after Clark left the House of Commons, and it was cited in the Harkess divorce case.

1993 non-fiction books
2000 non-fiction books
2002 non-fiction books
Series of books
Books about politics of the United Kingdom
Diaries